Athletes from the Socialist Federal Republic of Yugoslavia competed at the 1964 Winter Olympics in Innsbruck, Austria.  Yugoslavia returned to the Winter Olympic Games after having missed the 1960 Winter Olympics.

Alpine skiing

Men

Men's slalom

Women

Cross-country skiing

Men

Men's 4 × 10 km relay

Ice hockey

First round
Winners (in bold) qualified for the Group A to play for 1st-8th places. Teams, which lost their qualification matches, played in Group B for 9th-16th places.

|}

Consolation round 

Austria 6-2 Yugoslavia
Yugoslavia 5-3 Italy
Romania 5-5 Yugoslavia
Yugoslavia 6-4 Japan
Yugoslavia 4-2 Hungary
Poland 9-3 Yugoslavia
Norway 8-4 Yugoslavia

Ski jumping 

Athletes performed three jumps, the best two were counted and are shown here.

References
Official Olympic Reports
International Olympic Committee results database
 Olympic Winter Games 1964, full results by sports-reference.com

Nations at the 1964 Winter Olympics
1964
Winter Olympics